Minye Kyawhtin (also transliterated as Minyekyawdin) was a Burmese royal title, and usually refers to King Minye Kyawhtin of Toungoo Dynasty (r. 1673–1698).

Other people who wore the title were:

 Minye Kyawhtin of Pakhan:  Gov. of Pakhan (r. 1413–1426)
 Minye Kyawhtin of Toungoo:  King of Toungoo (r. 1452–1459)
 Minye Kyawhtin of Tharrawaddy:  Later known as King Minye Thihathu II of Toungoo (r. 1597–1609)

Burmese royal titles